I23 may refer to:
 HMS Albatross (I23)
 HMS Castleton (I23)